Milos Zivkovic (born November 18, 1986) is a former Canadian football wide receiver. He went undrafted in the 2009 CFL Draft. He played CIS football for the Simon Fraser Clan.

External links
Simon Fraser Clan bio

1986 births
Canadian football wide receivers
Living people
Players of Canadian football from British Columbia
Simon Fraser Clan football players
Sportspeople from Burnaby